Mr. Prime Minister is a story based on 2005 Bollywood political status film produced, directed and written by Dev Anand for Navketan films. The film stars himself, Shahbaz Khan, Prem Chopra, Boman Irani, Milind Gunaji, A.K. Hangal. The film was released to negative reviews.

Cast
Dev Anand as Johny Master
Tara Sharma as Roshanara
Shahbaz Khan
Mohan Joshi as Raja Sahab 
Prem Chopra
A.K. Hangal 
Boman Irani
Milind Gunaji
Dev Gill as Al Qaida man

Music
"Mr. Prime Minister" (Hindi) - Dev Anand
"Chuimui Si Zindagi" - Sunidhi Chauhan
"Main Khoya Tha Awara Hai" - Babul Supriyo
"Yeh Sama Hain Na" - Sunidhi Chauhan
"Mr Prime Minister" (English) - Dev Anand

References

External links
 

2005 films
2000s Hindi-language films
Films directed by Dev Anand
Films scored by Bappi Lahiri